Vatnsnes is a peninsula jutting into Húnaflói in northern Iceland. It is surrounded by waters of Miðfjörður on the west and Húnafjörður  on the east. It is home to one of the largest seal colonies in Iceland, among others at Hindisvík  and Ósar . Seals have been protected for many years in Hindisvík.  A stone hut was built at Ósar on the eastern side of the peninsula for seal watching.

Among geological features of Vatnsnes are Borgarvirki, a volcanic plug mentioned for its use as a fortress in the Sagas of Icelanders, and Hvítserkur, a 15 m high basalt rock formation near the eastern shore of the peninsula.

References 

North Iceland
Peninsulas of Iceland